Netsilik , Natsilik, Nattilik, Netsilingmiut, Natsilingmiutut, Nattilingmiutut, or Nattiliŋmiutut is an Inuit language variety spoken in western Nunavut, Canada, by Netsilik Inuit.

 ( 'people from Natsilik') came from  'seal' + postbase  'place with something' + postbase  'inhabitants of'.

Classification 
 There are three main dialect divisions of Natsilingmiutut dialect:
 Natsilik subdialect, or Natsilik/Netsilik proper
 Arviligjuaq subdialect
 Illuiliq subdialect

Special letters 
Natsilik dialect has the special letters: , used by some Nattiliŋmiut speakers.

š  – sounds a bit like English "shr" and is distinct from both the s sound that is used in words borrowed from English and the more common h sound.

  'Gjoa Haven'
  'about'
  'ground squirrel, marmot'

New encodings in Unicode were proposed for the Inuktitut syllabics corresponding to š and h. These 12 syllabic characters for Nattilingmiutut were included in version 14.0 of the Unicode Standard on 14 September 2021, are now formally part of the  Standard and are stable to use for digital text exchange. However, updates to system level syllabics fonts and keyboards to access the characters are underway and forthcoming.

ř  (in Inuktitut syllabics            ) – sounds like an English (retroflex) r. It is distinct from the r sound used by other dialects, which is closer to the r  sound made in French at the back of the throat.

  'eye' (cf. Inuktitut ᐃᔨ iji)
  'bearded seal' (cf. Inuktitut ᐅᒡᔪᒃ ugjuq)
  's/he replies, answers' (cf. Inuktitut ᑭᐅᔪᖅ kiujuq)
  's/he asks' (cf. Inuktitut ᐊᐱᕆᔪᖅ apirijuq)

 – A small number of Inuktitut-speakers use this character instead of ng.  The use of ng is deceiving because it makes use of two letters to represent what is a single sound.  In syllabics this sound is represented by a single character . Using this letter also makes the distinction between the sequence  and long  clearer, the first being spelled nŋ and the latter ŋŋ. In eastern varieties of Inuktitut which do not have the sequence , long  is spelled nng rather than ngng. When the letter ŋ is not used, the distinction may be made by spelling  n'ng and  nng.

  'lemming'
  'mountain'

Comparison

References 

Agglutinative languages
Indigenous languages of the North American Arctic
First Nations languages in Canada
Inuit languages
Inuktitut words and phrases